Miller Grove High School may refer to:

 Miller Grove High School (Georgia), United States
 Miller Grove High School (Texas), United States

See also 
 Grove High School (disambiguation)